Poliklinik Cheras (Peng Kuai) or Poliklinik Cahaya was a governmental hospital opened in October 1954 in Cheras, Selangor, Malaysia. The hospital closed down after 30 years of service in 1984.

History
The original name of the Poliklinik Cheras was The Lady Templer Hospital. It was named after the British doctor, Lady Templer. The hospital was opened in 1954. In 1955 the Federal Government donated 300,000 dollars to the hospital. In 1962 The Sultan of Selangor visited the hospital. The Lady Templer Hospital was renamed "Poliklinik Cheras" since it was in Cheras, Kuala Lumpur.

See also

 List of hospitals in Malaysia

References

External links
Ghosts Malaysia: Poliklinik Cheras on Blogspot

Hospital buildings completed in 1954
Defunct hospitals in Malaysia
Hospitals disestablished in 1984
Hospitals in Kuala Lumpur
Hospitals established in 1954
20th-century architecture in Malaysia